Gribovka is a rural locality (a village) in Kirillovsky Selsoviet, Ufimsky District, Bashkortostan, Russia. The population was 316 as of 2010. There are 8 streets.

Geography 
Gribovka is located 30 km northeast of Ufa (the district's administrative centre) by road. Kirillovo is the nearest rural locality.

References 

Rural localities in Ufimsky District